The Bear is an American production company and creative studio based in Austin, Texas. It was founded in 2007 by directors Ben Steinbauer and Berndt Mader. The company has produced feature films and narrative and documentary short films.

History
After meeting at the Radio, Television & Film at The University of Texas at Austin in 2004 and working on several projects together, Ben Steinbauer and Berndt Mader formed The Bear in 2007.

The Bear's documentary Winnebago Man (2009) is about an RV salesman named Jack Rebney who became a viral video sensation. Michael Moore called it “One of the funniest documentaries ever made”, and Roger Ebert named it one of his favorite films of 2010. The film was directed by Steinbauer and was named by the Austin Film Critics Association the Best Austin Film for 2010.

In 2011, Steinbauer and Mader were selected to direct a segment of the feature film, Slacker 2011, a remake of Richard Linklater's Slacker (1990) by 24 Austin-based filmmakers. The firm produced 5 Time Champion (2011), starring Betty Buckley, Jon Gries, and Dana Wheeler-Nicholson.  The film was written and directed by Mader and won the Target Filmmaker Award at the 2011 Dallas International Film Festival.

The firm co-produced the feature film Prince Avalanche (2013) directed by David Gordon Green, starring Paul Rudd and Emile Hirsch. Also produced in 2013 was Double Play (2013) directed by Gabe Klinger, about the relationship between Richard Linklater and experimental filmmaker, James Benning.

In 2015, the firm produced Booger Red (2015) directed by Mader, starring Ornur Turkel and Marija Karan. The film won the Special Jury Prize at the 2016 Dallas International Film Festival.

The firm has produced short films including Brute Force (2012); Bad Guy #2 (2014); Calls To Okies: The Park Grubbs Story (2015); The Superlative Light (2016); Death Metal (2016); Slow To Show (2016), directed by Steinbauer, which was acquired by The New York Times Op-Docs; and Heroes From the Storm (2017).

In 2017, The Bear joined the roster at Chelsea Pictures for commercial representation. In 2018, The Bear began working with AG Reps for representation in the Texas market.

Filmography

Film
 Siren Song (2018) - directed by Ben Steinbauer & Berndt Mader 
 Heroes From the Storm (2017) - directed by Ben Steinbauer & Berndt Mader 
 Slow To Show (2016) - directed by Ben Steinbauer
 The Superlative Light (2016) - directed by Ben Steinbauer
 The Superlative Light 360 VR (2016) - directed by Ben Steinbauer
 Death Metal (2016) - directed by Chris McInroy
 Calls To Okies: The Park Grubbs Story (2015) - directed by Ben Steinbauer & Bradley Beesley
 Bad Guy #2 (2014) - directed by Chris McInroy
 Documentary Subjects Wanted with Rory Scovel - Funny or Die (2013) - directed by Ben Steinbauer
 Brute Force (2012) - directed by Ben Steinbauer
 The Printer (2007) - directed by Berndt Mader
 Road to Tlacotepec (2006) - directed by Berndt Mader
 The Next Tim Day (2006) - directed by Ben Steinbauer
 Recently Deceased (2006) - directed by Chris McInroy
 Neutral Density (2005) - directed by Berndt Mader
 Smile and the World Smiles With You (2005) - directed by Ben Steinbauer
 A Thousand Words (2004) - directed by Ben Steinbauer
 Pay Dirt (2004) - directed by Berndt Mader

Music video
 Up Around The Sun “Up Around the Sun” (2018)
 Rainbows Are Free “Sonic Demon” (2017)
 The Mrs “I’m Enough” (2015)
 Spanish Gold “Out On the Street” (2014)
 Heartless Bastards “Parted Ways” (2012)

References

Film production companies of the United States
Mass media companies established in 2007